The 2017–18 Oklahoma Sooners basketball team represented the University of Oklahoma in the 2017–18 NCAA Division I men's basketball season. They were led by seventh-year head coach Lon Kruger and played their home games at the Lloyd Noble Center in Norman, Oklahoma as a member of the Big 12 Conference. They finished the season 18–14, 8–10 in Big 12 play to finish in a tie for eighth place. They lost in the First Round of the Big 12 tournament to Oklahoma State. They received an at-large bid to the NCAA tournament where they lost in the First Round to Rhode Island.

Previous season
The Sooners finished the 2016–17 season with an overall record of 11–20, 5–13 in Big 12 play to finish in ninth place. They lost in the first round of the Big 12 tournament to TCU.

Offseason

Departures

Incoming transfers

2017 recruiting class

Future recruits

2018–19 team recruits

Roster

Schedule and results

|-
!colspan=9 style=|New Zealand and Australia Foreign Tour

|-
!colspan=9 style=|Exhibition

|-
! colspan=9 style=|Regular season

|-
! colspan=9 style=| Big 12 Tournament

|-
!colspan=9 style=| NCAA tournament
|-

Source

Rankings

References

Oklahoma
Oklahoma Sooners men's basketball seasons
Oklahoma